Kuzuören is a village of county Zara, located in Sivas Province, Turkey.

Villages in Zara District